Ron Schieber (born April 3, 1960) is an American politician who served in the Missouri House of Representatives from 2011 to 2015.

References

1960 births
Living people
Republican Party members of the Missouri House of Representatives